Loserthink: How Untrained Brains Are Ruining America is a 2019 nonfiction book by Scott Adams, creator of Dilbert. Adams suggests that many otherwise intelligent people are trapped by unproductive ways of thinking. The reason for this, he says, is they don't have experience across multiple domains and thus are not equipped to think more productively. Loserthink introduces readers to the most useful thought patterns in a variety of disciplines. Adams wants to help employees identify mental barriers and how to break through them, as well as escape from their own "mental prisons." Loserthink is a New York Times Bestseller.

The book claims to show you how to think like a psychologist, artist, historian, engineer, leader, scientist and entrepreneur.

Adams has suggested two ideas for a calmer internet: the “48-hour rule,” where everyone should be given a grace period of a couple of days to retract any controversial statement they’ve made, and the “20-year rule,” where everyone should be automatically forgiven for any mistakes they made more than two decades ago—with the exception of certain serious crimes.

Ghostwriter Joshua Lisec said Loserthink's advantage is it appeals to a wide range of audiences.

References

2019 non-fiction books
Personal development
Self-help books
Books by Scott Adams
Portfolio (publisher) books